Ratandeep may refer to:

 Ratnadeep (film), a 1979 Hindi film directed by directed by Basu Chatterjee
 Ratnadeep, a 1951 Hindi and Bengali bi-lingual film directed by Debaki Bose
 Ratnadeep Adivrekar (born 1974), contemporary artist from India

See also
 Ratna Deepam, a 1953 Indian Tamil-language film directed by Debaki Bose
 Ranadeep Moitra (born 1968), Indian cricketer